Cybocephalus randalli is a species of beetle in the family Cybocephalidae. It is found in North America.

References

Further reading

 
 

Cucujoidea
Articles created by Qbugbot
Beetles described in 2006